Jozef Psotka, (12 February 1934, Košice, Czechoslovakia – , Mount Everest, Himalayas, Nepal) was a Slovak mountaineer, at that time the oldest person in the world who reached the summit of Mount Everest without oxygen.

Biography
He attended a high school in Košice, Czechoslovakia, and graduated in 1953. He had a lifetime passion for mountaineering, climbing Matterhorn and Kangchenjunga, among other peaks. On October 15, 1984, he reached the summit of Mount Everest without oxygen with Zoltán Demján and Sherpa Ang Rita. Together with Zoltan Demján, he was the first Slovak climber who reached the summit of Mount Everest. During the return they separated and Psotka accidentally fell 1,000 meters to his death.

See also

List of people who died climbing Mount Everest

Notes

External links
Everest Summits in the 1980-1985
List of Slovak ascensionists of the eight-thousanders
Ing. Jozef Psotka 
Sportsmen from Košice - Jozef Psotka 

1934 births
1984 deaths
Sportspeople from Košice
Slovak mountain climbers
Mountaineering deaths on Mount Everest